Charles Reginald Schirm (August 12, 1864 – November 2, 1918) was a U.S. Representative from Maryland.

Born in Baltimore, Maryland to German immigrants, Schirm attended the public schools.  He commenced, but did not complete, an apprenticeship in iron molding, and attended Washington and Jefferson College of Washington, Pennsylvania.  He went on to teach school in Pennsylvania and Maryland.  He studied law, was admitted to the Baltimore County bar in 1896, and practiced.  He also served as member of the Maryland House of Delegates from 1898 to 1900, and as counsel to the board of police commissioners of the city of Baltimore in 1899 and 1900.

Schirm was elected as a Republican to the Fifty-seventh Congress (March 4, 1901 – March 3, 1903), but was an unsuccessful candidate for reelection in 1902 to the Fifty-eighth Congress.  He later served as delegate to the Bull Moose National Convention in 1912, and continued the practice of law in Baltimore, where he died.  He is interred in Loudon Park Cemetery.

Personal life
On March 8, 1891, Schirm married Annie Maude Charlton in Lily Dale, New York.

References

1864 births
1918 deaths
Republican Party members of the Maryland House of Delegates
Washington & Jefferson College alumni
Maryland lawyers
American Lutherans
American people of German descent
Politicians from Baltimore
Maryland Progressives (1912)
Republican Party members of the United States House of Representatives from Maryland
Lawyers from Baltimore
19th-century American politicians